Rosa T. Sheng is an architect based in San Francisco, California. She is a Fellow of the American Institute of Architects. After a career at Bohlin Cywinski Jackson, she joined SmithGroup as a principal in 2017, where she heads the firm's Equity, Diversity and Inclusion Program. Sheng is president of the American Institute of Architects San Francisco, the first Asian American Woman to serve in this role in the organization’s 136 years. She is the founding chair of Equity by Design (formerly known as The Missing 32%), originating author of AIA Resolution 15-1 Equity in Architecture, a member of the AIA Equity in Architecture Commission, and a frequent speaker, writer, and campaigner for equity and inclusion.

Early life and education 
Sheng graduated from Syracuse University with a Bachelor in Architecture.

Career

Architectural practice 
Sheng spent 20 years as an architect at Bohlin Cywinski Jackson in San Francisco, where she was responsible for a number of projects as designer, project manager and project architect. Her work on Apple stores in New York and San Francisco led to a patented glass stair design. Other notable projects include: Pixar Animation Studios, Emeryville, California (2001); the Lorry I. Lokey Graduate School of Business, Mills College, Oakland, California (2009); and California Avenue New Lecture Hall, University of California, Davis (2014).

She is currently a Principal of SmithGroup, San Francisco, where she specializes in active learning, university design, and workplace design, and is Director of Equity, Diversity + Inclusion for practice.

Advocacy for social change
In 2013, Sheng founded Equity By Design as an AIA San Francisco Committee to build a platform of community support for change in the profession. Equity by Design conducts surveys about working conditions in architecture, disseminates research findings, and shares resources about equitable practice. She has also led or advised AIA initiatives including the AIA Equity in Architecture Commission, AIA Women's Leadership Summit, and AIA Diversity Council.

Awards 
 AIASF Presidential Commendation, 2014 - Individual Achievements for Equity in Architecture 
 AIASF Presidential Commendation, 2014 - Equity by Design Achievements for Equity in Architecture 
 Beverly Willis Foundation Leadership Award, 2017

References

External links
 Equity By Design
 Why Equity Matters, TEDxPhiladelphia talk, June 2015

21st-century American architects
20th-century American architects
American feminists
American women's rights activists
American women architects
Syracuse University alumni
Fellows of the American Institute of Architects
Living people
Year of birth missing (living people)
20th-century American women
21st-century American women